The 1908 United States presidential election in New Hampshire took place on November 3, 1908 as part of the 1908 United States presidential election. Voters chose four representatives, or electors to the Electoral College, who voted for president and vice president.

New Hampshire solidly voted for the Republican nominee, Secretary of War William Howard Taft, over the Democratic nominee, former U.S. Representative William Jennings Bryan. Taft won the state by a margin of 21.76%.

Results

Results by county

References

New Hampshire
1908
1908 New Hampshire elections